New Democracy Party (Phak Prachathipataimai) is a political party in Thailand that founded on 21 April 2011. Suratin Pichan is Leader and Nipon Chuenta is Deputy Leader and Jumrus Kraiyasit is Secretary-General.

Election results

References 

Political parties in Thailand